Giorgia Campana (born 16 May 1995) is an Italian artistic gymnast.  She competed for her country at the 2012 Summer Olympics.

Senior career

2011 
In May, Campana competed at the Italian Championships in Meda, Italy.  She placed eighth in the all around competition with a score of 51.450.

In October, Campana competed at the World Championships in Tokyo, Japan.  She contributed scores of 13.533 on uneven bars and 13.700 on balance beam towards the Italian team's ninth-place finish.

2012 
In March, Campana competed at the City of Jesolo Trophy in Jesolo, Italy.  She contributed an all around score of 54.850 toward the Italian team's second-place finish.

In May, Campana competed at the European Championships in Brussels, Belgium.  In the team final, she scored 14.233 on the uneven bars which helped the Italian team win the bronze medal.

In June, Campana competed at the Italian Championships in Catania, Italy.  In event finals, she won the gold medal on uneven bars with a score of 14.200.

London Olympics 
At the end of July, Campana competed at the 2012 Summer Olympics in London, United Kingdom.  In the team final, she contributed an uneven bars score of 13.900 toward the Italian team's seventh-place finish.

References

External links 

 
 

1995 births
Living people
Italian female artistic gymnasts
Olympic gymnasts of Italy
Gymnasts at the 2012 Summer Olympics
Gymnasts of Gruppo Sportivo Esercito
Gymnasts at the 2015 European Games
European Games competitors for Italy
Mediterranean Games gold medalists for Italy
Mediterranean Games bronze medalists for Italy
Competitors at the 2013 Mediterranean Games
Mediterranean Games medalists in gymnastics
20th-century Italian women
21st-century Italian women